Ihango is an administrative ward in the Mbeya Rural district of the Mbeya Region of Tanzania. In 2016 the Tanzania National Bureau of Statistics report there were 9,194 people in the ward, from 8,342 in 2012.

Villages and hamlets 
The ward has 6 villages, and 49 hamlets.

 Haporoto
 Ibomani
 Fikeni
 Gezaulole
 Soweto
 Igoma
 Itiliwindi
 Shihokwa
 Mwawayo
 Sokolo
 Idimi
 Isanga A
 Fatahilo
 Uzunguni
 Makungulu
 Majengo
 Inyala
 Kijiweni
 Kidungu
 Isengo
 Jangwani
 Mwabowo
 Nonde
 Isyagunga
 Iyunga
 Itigi
 Ituta
 Galilaya
 Impomu
 Malagala
 Shiwe
 Impombombo
 Ilambo
 Linga
 Iwanza
 Songambele
 Ntangano
 Itete
 Ilolezya
 Itete 'B'
 Ileya
 Itaka
 Itiliwindi
 Uzunguni A
 Uzunguni B
 Isangati A
 Isangati B
 Izagati
 Mbeye
 Ishinda
 Sibempe
 Iwindi
 Ipinda
 Ipinda
 Simwambalafu

References 

Wards of Mbeya Region